Marian Stamate (born 6 April 1946) is a Romanian volleyball player. He competed in the men's tournament at the 1972 Summer Olympics.

References

1946 births
Living people
Romanian men's volleyball players
Olympic volleyball players of Romania
Volleyball players at the 1972 Summer Olympics
Sportspeople from Bucharest